is a railway station in Kure, Hiroshima Prefecture, Japan.

Lines
West Japan Railway Company
Kure Line

History 
Karugahama Station opened on 7 February 1999.

Adjacent stations

|-
!colspan=5|JR West

References 

Railway stations in Hiroshima Prefecture
Railway stations in Japan opened in 1999